A Curious Hieroglyphic Bible is an early American children's book. Published in by Isaiah Thomas in Worcester, Massachusetts in 1788, it is a Bible partially in rebus form (some words replaced by pictures). It is not to be confused with a similar work of the same name published in 1784 in London by Thomas Hodgson.

The book, of which only four remaining copies are known to exist, contains almost 500 woodcuts. This was the first American rebus bible, a popular form in the late 18th century for introducing children to bible reading. The book was one of 88 books included in the Library of Congress's 2012 exhibition "Books That Shaped America".

References

1788 non-fiction books
1780s children's books
18th-century Christian texts
Bibles for children
History of Worcester, Massachusetts
Illustrated books

Digital copy @ World Digital Library